The Pride of the Company (German: Der Stolz der Kompanie) is a 1926 German silent comedy film directed by Georg Jacoby and starring Reinhold Schünzel, Georg H. Schnell and Camilla Spira.

The film's sets were designed by the art directors Otto Erdmann and Hans Sohnle.

Cast
Reinhold Schünzel as Wilhelm - der Stolz der Kompagnie  
Georg H. Schnell as DCaptain 
Camilla Spira as Minna  
Henry Bender as sergeant  
Sig Arno as recruit #2 
Paul Morgan as recruit #2 
Kurt Vespermann as Musketier Franz  
Werner Pittschau as Leutnant Fritz von Gernsdorf  
Fritz Kampers as Sergeant Müller 
Lydia Potechina as Frau Witwe Niemeyer  
Hugo Werner-Kahle as Gutsbesitzer von Redern  
Elga Brink as Meta von Redern 
Julius Falkenstein as Oberstleutnant Erich von Falkenhagen  
Olga Engl as Karla von Wendhausen

References

External links

Films of the Weimar Republic
German silent feature films
Films directed by Georg Jacoby
German comedy films
Military humor in film
German black-and-white films
1926 comedy films
Silent comedy films
1920s German films